Rock It may refer to:

Songs 
 "Rock It" (George Jones song), 1956
 "Rock It" (Lipps Inc. song), 1980
 "Rock It" (Little Red song), 2010
 "Rock It" / "Follow the Light", by Sub Focus, 2009
 "Rock It (Prime Jive)", by Queen, 1980
 "Rock It", by Master P from Game Face, 2001
 "Rock It", by Motörhead from Another Perfect Day, 1983
 "Rock It", by Ofenbach, 2019

Other uses 
 Rock It (music festival), an Australian music festival

See also 
 Rockit (disambiguation)
 Rocket (disambiguation)